Paul Milliet (14 February 1848 – 21 November 1924) was a French playwright and librettist of the Parisian Belle Époque.

His opera librettos include Jules Massenet's Hérodiade (1881) and Werther (1892), Alfred Bruneau's Kérim (1887), Spyridon Samaras's La biondinetta (1903), Mademoiselle de Belle Isle (1905) and Rhea (1908) and Camille Erlanger's Forfaiture (1921). He was married to soprano Ada Adini.

Works 
Opera
1881: Hérodiade, opera in 4 acts and 7 tableaux, with Henri Grémont, music by Jules Massenet, Brussels, La Monnaie, 19 December
1883: Mathias Corvin, one-act opéra comique, with Jules Levallois, music by Sándor Bertha, Paris, Théâtre de l'Opéra-Comique 
1887: Nadia, one-act opéra comique, music by Jules Bordier, Opéra-Populaire, 25 May
1887: Kérim, three-act drame lyrique, music by Alfred Bruneau, Théâtre du Château d'Eau, 9 June
1891: Néron, pantomime in 3 acts, music by Édouard Lalo, Hippodrome au pont de l'Alma, 28 March.
1892: Werther, drame lyrique in 4 acts and 5 tableaux, after Johann Wolfgang von Goethe, with Édouard Blau and Georges Hartmann, music by Jules Massenet, Wiener Staatsoper, 16 February
1895: Amy Robsart, opera in 3 acts and 4 tableaux, en prose rythmée, after Walter Scott, with Augustus Harris, music by Isidore de Lara, London, Drury Lane
1896: André Chénier, historical drama in 4 tableaux, by Luigi Illica, French version by Paul Milliet, Milan, La Scala
1898: Cavalleria rusticana, drame lyrique in 2 acts, by Giovanni Targioni Tozzetti and Guido Menasci, French version by Paul Milliet, music by Pietro Mascagni
1899: Le Duc de Ferrare, drame lyrique, music by Georges Marty, Théâtre de la Renaissance, 30 May
1900: Martin et Martine, Flemish tale in 3 acts, music by Émile Trépard, Théâtre de la Renaissance, 6 February
1902: Adriana Lecouvreur, comédie-drame by Eugène Scribe and Ernest Legouvé shortened to 4 acts by Arturo Colautti, French version by Paul Milliet, music by Francesco Cilea
1903: Storia d’amore o La biondinetta, opéra, music by Spyros Samaras, Milan, Teatro Lirico Internazionale
1904: Le Réveil du Bouddha, mystère lyrique in 3 episodes, music by Isidore de Lara, Gand, Théâtre Royal, 1 December
1905: Mademoiselle de Belle-Isle, drame lyrique in 4 acts, music by Spyros Samaras, Genoa, Teatro Politeama
1908: Rhea, drame musical in 3 parts, music by Spyros Samaras, Florence, Teatro Verdi
1911: Sibéria, drame lyrique in 3 acts, by Luigi Illica, French version by Paul Milliet, Opéra Garnier, 9 June
1912: Le Cobzar, drame lyrique in 2 acts, with Hélène Vacaresco, music by Gabrielle Ferrari, Opéra Garnier, 30 March
1913: Le Château de la Bretèche, drame lyrique in 4 acts and 5 tableaux, after the short story by Balzac, with Jacques Dor, music by Albert Dupuis, Nice, Opéra, 28 March
1913: La vida breve, poem in 2 acts and 4 tableaux, by Carlos Fernández Shaw, French version by Paul Milliet, music by Manuel de Falla, 1 April
1913: Le Drapeau, patriotic tale in 2 acts, after the short story by Jules Claretie, music by Charles Pons, Paris, Théâtre de la Gaîté-Lyrique, 1913
1921: Forfaiture, musical comedy in 5 episodes, after the film by Hector Turnbill, with André de Lorde, music by Camille Erlanger, Théâtre de l'Opéra-Comique, 9 February
1930: La Grand'mère, comédie lyrique in 2 acts, after Victor Hugo, music by Charles Silver, Théâtre de l'Opéra-Comique, 7 October 
Theatre
1885: Le Roi de l'argent, five-act drama, Théâtre de l'Ambigu, 13 November
1904: Electra, five-act play, by Benito Pérez Galdós, adaptation by Paul Milliet, Théâtre de la Porte-Saint-Martin, 20 May 
Varia
1873: Notes romantiques à propos de Marion Delorme, preface by Alfred de Musset
1874: De l'origine du théâtre à Paris
1874: Premières poésies : Avril. Le Livre d'heures de l'amour. De tout un peu
1888: Chants français, lyrics and music collected by Paul Milliet, under the direction and with a preface by Paul Déroulède

References

External links
 
 Paul Milliet on data.bnf.fr

See also 

 Félix Milliet

People from Rio de Janeiro (city)
1848 births
1924 deaths
French opera librettists
19th-century French dramatists and playwrights
20th-century French dramatists and playwrights
French male dramatists and playwrights
19th-century French male writers
20th-century French male writers
Belle Époque